Frank Sawyer may refer to:

 Frank Sawyer (criminal) (1899–1979), American outlaw and prison escapee
 Frank Sawyer (writer) (1906–1980), riverkeeper on the Wiltshire Avon, originator of the Pheasant Tail Nymph, a fly-fishing lure
 Frank Grant Sawyer (1918–1996), Governor of Nevada, 1959–1967
 Frank Sawyer (Ohio politician) (1952–2015), member of the Ohio House of Representatives